Warr Acres may refer to:

 Warr Acres, Oklahoma, a city in Oklahoma County, Oklahoma, United States
 Warr Acres (band) (formerly VMusic), an American band
 Warr Acres (album), an album from the band Warr Acres
 Warr Acres (Tulsa King), an episode of the American crime drama Tulsa King